Joels jul (Joel's Christmas) was the 1992 edition of Sveriges Radio's Christmas Calendar.

Plot
Joel is a schoolboy. December is his lucky month, since it includes his birthday, his name day (Oskar), and Christmas.

References
 

1992 radio programme debuts
1992 radio programme endings
Sveriges Radio's Christmas Calendar